His Auto's Maiden Trip is a 1912 silent short film directed by Dell Henderson and produced by the Biograph Company. It was distributed through the General Film Company. It was shown in split-reel form with The Club-Man and the Crook(1912).

Cast
Edward Dillon - Mr. Jinx
Florence Lee - Mrs. Jinx
Charles Murray - A Tramp
John T. Dillon - A Policeman
Florence Auer -

References

External links
http://imdb.com

1912 short films
Lost American films
American black-and-white films
Films directed by Dell Henderson
Biograph Company films
American silent short films
1912 comedy films
Silent American comedy films
1912 films
1912 lost films
Lost comedy films
1910s American films